Pretty Together is the sixth studio album by the Canadian rock group Sloan. While the album still has the 1960s and 1970s influences of Sloan's previous albums, it is more melancholy with fewer of the upbeat songs found on previous albums. "If It Feels Good Do It" and "The Other Man" were the two singles released from the album, with the latter being a melancholy plea by Chris Murphy which marked a departure from the usual upbeat songs Murphy provides the group with. The album entered the Canadian Albums Chart at #12, and both singles received notable radio airplay in Canada. The album was nominated for Best Rock Album at the 2002 Juno Awards.

Track listing

Japanese bonus tracks

B-sides
 "Pretty Together (demo)" (Comes With a Smile vol 3 compilation)

Year-end charts

References 

2001 albums
Sloan (band) albums
Murderecords albums